Howie Island is an island, with an area of 4.1 ha, in south-eastern Australia.  It is part of the Petrel Island Group, lying in Bass Strait close to Walker and Robbins Islands in north-west Tasmania.  It is surrounded by extensive mudflats.

Fauna
Recorded breeding seabird species include Pacific gull and Caspian tern. Rabbits are also present.

References

Islands of Tasmania